Thomas Randolph "Randy" Campbell  is an  American football quarterback who played for Auburn University, an NCAA Division I-A school; is a speaker and wealth management and life insurance professional.

He is best known for his two years as Auburn University's starting quarterback and leader of the 1983 SEC Championship Tigers. Upon graduation Campbell held NCAA passing records and was named MVP of the 1982 Tangerine Bowl. Campbell founded Campbell Wealth Management, LLC, a wealth management and life insurance company.

Early life

Randy Campbell was born in North Carolina. Campbell and his family moved to Hartselle, Alabama when Campbell was in the second grade where he attending Hartselle Elementary School. He went to Morgan County High School, now known as Hartselle High School. Campbell was the starting quarterback for several years at Morgan County High School.

Campbell served as class president of Morgan County High School.

College years
Campbell played under Coach Pat Dye as the starting quarterback during the 1982 and 1983 seasons. Other standouts on those teams were Bob Harris, David Jordan, Al Del Greco, Tommie Agee, Lionel "Little Train" James, John "Jay" Jacobs and Ben Thomas. The 1982 season is highlighted with the victory over state rival the University of Alabama Crimson Tide and Coach Paul "Bear" Bryant after a nine-year losing streak. Campbell then led the Tigers to a victory over Boston College in the Tangerine Bowl.

Campbell was named Most Valuable Player in that game where two future Heisman Trophy winners played as well; Vincent "Bo" Jackson (Auburn University) and Doug Flutie (Boston College). As Team Captain in 1983, Campbell led the Tigers to a consecutive victory over the Crimson Tide finishing the year 11–1.

Entrepreneurship and philanthropy
Campbell has served as a member on Auburn University Foundation Board since 2014. The foundation board is responsible for oversight of Auburn University’s 1.1 billion dollar endowment. He chaired the Membership Committee which is responsible for identifying and recruiting eminantly qualified Auburn Alumni nationally to serve on its Foundation Board. His tenure concludes in 2022.

Campbell was the 2009 unanimous selection for Auburn's Board of Trustess Sixth District (Shelby County) during the Governor Riley tenure.

Campbell continues to work closely with Auburn Universities Development Department raising millions of dollars through Planned Gift tools which benefits Auburn now and well into the future.

Campbell serves on Auburn Athletics Advisors Committee.

From 2011 to 2022 Campbell was a board member on Auburn University's team surgeon and orthopedic doctor Dr. Jim Andrew's American Medical Institute Foundation (AMI).

Campbell is a past Captain (President) of the Birmingham Monday Morning Quarterback Club whose main mission is fundraising for Birmingham Children's Hospital.

From 1995 to 2000 Campbell was Auburn Network (Television) color analyst for football coverage. 

Campbell served as Birmingham's co-chair of Auburn's billion dollar Capital Campaign. 

Campbell is a cancer survivor and gives to cancer research and various cancer related Alabama charities.

References

Living people
People from Hartselle, Alabama
American football quarterbacks
Auburn Tigers football players
Players of American football from Birmingham, Alabama
Insurance agents
Year of birth missing (living people)